Asthenotricha parabolica is a moth in the family Geometridae. It was described by Claude Herbulot in 1954. It is endemic to Madagascar.

References

Moths described in 1954
parabolica
Moths of Madagascar
Endemic fauna of Madagascar